Steve Grainger is an English electronic music composer and performer. His current project is nada (always written in lower-case letters).

Biography
Grainger has been active as a musician and producer for almost 30 years, in which time he has worked as a music writer for TV production companies, produced numerous records and played in several bands - most notably, those of the mid-noughties Brighton scene such as The Customers and The Small.

In 1999 he signed with Infectious Records, a subsidiary of Mushroom Records as a founder member of Elevator Suite with DJs Andy Childs and Paul Roberts, a band whose first two singles were crowned "Record Of The Week" on BBC Radio 1, and who went on to tour Europe with Morcheeba and release a critically acclaimed album: Barefoot & Shitfaced.

nada
nada's music references a variety of sources including post-war European 'art' music, classical impressionism, expressionism and romanticism, musique concrète, ethnic folk musics, circus bands, fairground mechanical organs, minimalism, electronica, post rock, ambient, dance music, easy listening and jazz.

The name nada, according to Grainger is: "...supposed to indicate my attitude toward music; you see, 'nada' is the ancient Sanskrit word for the universal sound vibration - which I believe gives rise to the entire universe, everything we know... and of course, it's also Spanish for 'nothing' so, to me, 'nada' means 'everything and nothing', which is how I think about music..!"

Live performances - which are rare - either consist of just Steve with a laptop and a few auxiliary instruments or comprise a small 'chamber' group of musicians from other acts on the Drift Records roster. A typical 'Group' line-up might include: Johny Lamb (Thirty Pounds of Bone, Cottonmouth Rocks, Actress Hands) on Cornet, Sally Megee (Cottonmouth Rocks) on Keyboard, Rob Woolhouse (The Burns Unit) on Bass, Jon Pugh (The Poppycocks) on Drums and Tim Didymus on Saxophone.

nada's debut album how to avoid matrimony features instrumental contributions from Johny Lamb, Jon Pugh, Tim Didymus, Andy Halliday, Annie Kerr and Art Holland. It is released in 2009 on UK-based independent label Drift Records.

nada Discography 
how to avoid matrimony (2009)

References

External links
 nada at Reverb Nation

n
Living people
Musicians from Brighton and Hove
Place of birth missing (living people)
Year of birth missing (living people)